Longistylus is a genus of spiders in the family Pycnothelidae. It was first described in 2005 by Indicatti & Lucas. , it contains only one Brazilian species, Longistylus ygapema.

References

Pycnothelidae
Monotypic Mygalomorphae genera
Spiders of Brazil